Lieven De Cauter (born 1959 in Koolskamp) is a Belgian philosopher, art historian, writer, and activist based in Brussels.  He has written and edited numerous books focusing on contemporary art, architecture, politics, and the city, including: The Capsular Civilization: On the City in the Age of Fear; Heterotopia and the City: Public space in a Postcivil society, co-edited with Michiel Dehaene; and Art and Activism in the Age of Gloablization, co-edited with Karel van Haesebrouck and Ruben De Roo. As an activist, he initiated the BRussels Tribunal on the war in Iraq and is a co-founder of Platform for Liberty of Expression.

Selected publications

References

Living people
1959 births
Belgian activists
21st-century Belgian philosophers